Edgar Graham Kiralfy (August 20, 1884 – May 13, 1928) was an American athlete. He competed at the 1908 Summer Olympics in London. He was born in New York City. In the 100 metres, Kiralfy placed fourth of five in his first round heat to be eliminated from competition.

References

Sources
 
 
 

1884 births
1928 deaths
American male sprinters
Olympic track and field athletes of the United States
Athletes (track and field) at the 1908 Summer Olympics